Charles Wayne "Chuck" Day (August 5, 1942 – March 10, 2008), also known as Bing Day, was an American guitarist and baritone bluesman from the South Side of Chicago.

Biography
His musical talents began to develop at age 3, and at age 15, he recorded the single "Pony Tail Partner" under the name Bing Day at Federal Records (1957). Day recorded several singles over the next ten years as 'Bing Day' and, also, 'Ford Hopkins'.

He moved to Los Angeles, California, in 1965 and began a career as one of the most listened to "unknown" artists in rock and roll. He became bassist with Johnny Rivers' Band. Day invented the signature lead guitar riff afterward used by Rivers in "Secret Agent Man".

Day worked with the Mamas and the Papas in 1967, again as bassist, also playing as second guitarist on "Monday, Monday" and "California Dreamin'".

During the 1970s and 1980s, Day played on numerous recordings including Shel Silverstein's Freaker's Ball. He also wrote for the soundtrack of Fritz the Cat and performed with musicians Luther Tucker and Merl Saunders.

Day formed his own band in 1986.

Day resided in Fairfax, California from 1969, and continued to play locally in the San Rafael area of California until he was taken ill in January 2007. After three months of care at Marin General Hospital, he was admitted to Santa Rosa Memorial Hospital before being relocated to District Hospital in Healdsburg, where he remained until his death on March 10, 2008.

A memorial and parade was held in Fairfax for Day on March 22, 2008.

After his death, it was revealed he was the biological father of Owen Vanessa Elliot, the daughter of singer Cass Elliot of the Mamas and The Papas.

Discography

Solo releases
 "Pony Tail Partner" / "Since You Left Me" - Federal Records (1957) as Bing Day
 "Rain Silver Dollar" / "Dancing Puppets" - Fraternity Records (1958) as Bing Day With Danny Bell And The Bell Hops 
 "Poor Stagger Lee" - Mercury Records (1958)
 "Mama's Place" / "I Can't Help It" - Mercury Records (1959) as Bing Day
 "Mary's Place" / "How Do I Do It" - Mercury Records (1959) as Bing Day 
 "Ya Fine, Fine, Fine" - Apex Records (1959) as Ford Hopkins
 "How Do I Do It" - Mercury Records (1960)
 "She Was Not My Kind" - Apex Records (1961)
 "Memphis Tennessee" - Cameo/Parkway Records (1966)
 "We Gotta Get Outta this Place" - Fraternity Records (1967)

With Johnny Rivers (1965)
 "Here We GoGo Again"
 "Rivers Rocks the Folk"

With The Mamas & the Papas (1965-1966)
 "Monday, Monday" - Second Guitar
 "California Dreamin'" - Second Guitar

With The Young Gyants (1968)
 "Tom Dooley" / "We Gotta Get Out Of This Place" - Parkway
 "Memphis" / "It Hurts So Bad" - Cameo-Parkway (1964)

With Shel Silverstein (1971)
 Freakin' At The Freaker's Ball

The Chuck Day Band (1997)
 Desperate Measures

With Steven Wolf (2006)
 20th Century Wolf, Volume I
Day co-wrote "You Don't Love Me Anymore" with Steven Wolf and Annie McIntyre; played lead guitar on the 2006 recording of the song.

Soundtracks

Fritz the Cat
 "House Rock"
 "Winston"

Switchblade Sisters
 "Full Track"

Blacula
 "Black Girl"

One Flew Over the Cuckoo's Nest
 played the waterphone

Television and video
 Sleazy Arms Hotel with Jim Gabbert (1998)
 Pacifica Public Access (1998)
 Zone Music Local Showcase (1998)
 Boney Maroni Promotional - Lifesigns Photo (2000)
 various Lifesigns Photo video (2000 to present)
 numerous commercial voice-overs including "Fall into the Gap" and "Member FDIC"

Other projects
 Chuck Day and the Burning Sensations
 Fairfax Tavernacle Choir
 The Dori Green/Dave Bergman Show
 The 19 Broadway Swing Band
 The Chuck and Sam Duet

References

External links
 Chuck Day and the Burning Sensations website

1942 births
2008 deaths
American blues guitarists
American rhythm and blues guitarists
American male guitarists
American blues singers
American blues singer-songwriters
Singers from Chicago
Soul-blues musicians
20th-century American singers
20th-century American guitarists
People from Fairfax, California
Guitarists from Chicago
20th-century American male musicians
American male singer-songwriters
Singer-songwriters from Illinois
Singer-songwriters from California